Herman Schultz may refer to:

 Shocker (comics), a Marvel Comics supervillain with the alter ego Herman Schultz
 Herman Schultz (sport shooter) (1901–?), Monegasque sports shooter
 Herman C. Schultz (1860–?), member of the Wisconsin State Senate
 Herman Schultz (astronomer) (1823–1890), Swedish astronomer